Gabriella Csépe (born June 13, 1973 in Gyöngyös) is a former breaststroke swimmer from Hungary, who competed in two consecutive Summer Olympics for her native country, starting at the 1988.

Her best Olympic results came in 1992, when she finished in sixth (100 m Breaststroke) and in ninth (200 m Breaststroke) position. She also competed for American University during her NCAA career. She graduated with honors in 1996 from American University with bachelor's degree in accounting. She completed her MBA studies at Kent State University in 1998 and received her CPA license in summer of 2001. She and her husband, Ali Rezaiyan, have two children, Ariana and Armin.

References

1973 births
Living people
People from Gyöngyös
Olympic swimmers of Hungary
Hungarian female breaststroke swimmers
Kent State University alumni
Swimmers at the 1988 Summer Olympics
Swimmers at the 1992 Summer Olympics
Sportspeople from Heves County